Carmel Academy (formerly the Westchester Fairfield Hebrew Academy) was a Jewish private school in Greenwich, Connecticut, serving grades Kindergarten through 8. Also including transitional Kindergarten  The school originally was located in Port Chester, New York.

In 2020, Carmel Academy announced their plans to close at the end of the school year.

History
The school opened in a rented space in Port Chester, New York in 1998. The school was established by parents who were unable to send their children to the Solomon Schechter School of Westchester in White Plains, New York, as that school was oversubscribed. The parents wanted the teaching of the torah to go by themes instead of being taught chronologically, and it wanted the school to mix its instruction of world history with Jewish history. The school had 24 students when it opened.

The school has been located in Greenwich since 2001. Originally, the school occupied areas within Temple Sholom, the largest synagogue in Greenwich. The school's physical education program consisted of weekly visits to the YMCA and basketball, played with a basketball hoop in the parking lot of the temple. In 2005 it had 108 students. In 2006 it had 130 students.

In the 2000s, The Japanese School of New York had vacant buildings due to their decreased student population. In 2006, the Westchester Fairfield Hebrew Academy purchased The Japanese School of New York's 15 Ridgeway campus from the Japanese Education Alliance for $20 million, and classes began there in September 2006. The Japanese School still uses the campus for classes.  The Hebrew school leased several buildings on the campus to the Japanese school for up to eight years.

In 2006, Carmel school administrators decided to place a maximum enrolment of 325 students, with a maximum of two classes with 18 students each per grade, so that the school's students receive individual attention from teachers. As of 2009, the school has about 230 students.

In 2020, Carmel Academy announced that they would close down at the end of the school year. A letter from Carmel referred students to the Leffell School, stating that there would be integration of Carmel programs there, although Lefell stated that Carmel was simply closing and that it was not merging into Lefell.

Campus
The campus, the former Rosemary Hall school for girls, has  of space and 15 buildings. The classes of the Hebrew school and the Japanese school were held in separate buildings, while both schools shared the fieldstone gymnasium. The school was the only Jewish educational institution in the world to house a Christian chapel, St. Bede's Chapel. The company Carrere and Hastings had designed the chapel, which was completed in 1909.

Curriculum
The school has Judaic studies, language arts, mathematics, and science. The curriculum includes the history of the Jewish people, the Hebrew language, and information about Israel. The Hebrew language program teaches the language as a modern language, and students use literature, newspapers, poems, and songs to learn the language.

The school uses the Providing Alternative Learning Strategies (PALS) program to teach students with language-based learning disabilities.

Extra-curricular activities
Extra-curricular activities include a student newspaper, Chidon HaTanach Bible Contest, E2K, student government, and the Math Olympiad.

References

External links

 Carmel Academy

Schools in Fairfield County, Connecticut
Private elementary schools in Connecticut
Private middle schools in Connecticut
Private K–8 schools in the United States
Educational institutions established in 1998
1998 establishments in New York (state)
Greenwich, Connecticut
Port Chester, New York
Schools in Westchester County, New York
Private elementary schools in New York (state)
Private middle schools in New York (state)